Byron Smith may refer to:

 Byron Smith (rugby league) (born 1984), English rugby league player
 Byron Smith (American football) (born 1962), American football player
 Byron Smith (basketball) (born 1969), American basketball coach
 Byron Smith (golfer) (born 1981), American golfer
  Byron David Smith, American veteran convicted of murdering burglars at his home